Robert Jackson Gamble (February 7, 1851September 22, 1924) was a U.S. Representative and Senator from South Dakota. He was the father of Ralph Abernethy Gamble and brother of John Rankin Gamble, members of South Dakota's prominent Gamble family.

Early life
Gamble was born in Genesee County, near Akron, New York, the son of Robert Gamble and Jennie (Abernethy) Gamble.  In 1862, he moved with his parents to Fox Lake, Wisconsin.  In 1874, he graduated from Lawrence University in Appleton, Wisconsin with a Bachelor of Science degree, and he later received his Master of Science from Lawrence.  While attending college, Gamble taught school in the summer to pay his tuition.  After graduating, he studied law with the Milwaukee firm of Jenkins, Elliot & Wheeler, and was admitted to the bar in 1875.  He moved to Yankton in the portion of the Dakota Territory which later became South Dakota.

Start of career
A Republican, he became a district attorney for the second judicial district of the Territory of Dakota in 1880, and was Yankton's city attorney in 1881 and 1882.  He served on the Territorial Council in 1885.  In 1894 he was elected to Seat B, one of South Dakota's two at-large seats in the U.S. House of Representatives, and he served in the Fifty-fourth Congress.  He ran unsuccessfully for reelection in 1896, but was again elected to Seat B in 1898, and served in the Fifty-sixth Congress. During the Fifty-sixth Congress, he became the chairman of the U.S. House Committee on Expenditures on the Public Buildings.

U.S. Senator
In 1901, Gamble was elected to the United States Senate.  Re-elected in 1906, he served until March 1913, after being an unsuccessful candidate for renomination.  During his senate career, he was chairman of the: Committee on Indian Depredations (57th Congress); Committee on Transportation Routes to the Seaboard (58th to 60th Congresses); Committee on Indian Affairs (62nd Congress); and Committee on Enrolled Bills (64th Congress).

Later life
In 1915, Gamble moved to Sioux Falls and resumed the practice of law.  From 1916 to 1924 he served as a referee in bankruptcy for the southern district of South Dakota. He was a member of the National Executive Committee of the League to Enforce Peace.

Death and burial
Gamble died in Sioux Falls, and was buried at Yankton City Cemetery in Yankton.

Honors
In 1909, Lawrence University awarded Gamble the honorary degree of LL.D.

Family
In 1884, Gamble married Carrie S. Osborne of Portage, Wisconsin.  They were the parents of two sons, Ralph and George.

References

Sources

Books

External links

Gamble Family at The Political Graveyard

Members of the Dakota Territorial Legislature
19th-century American politicians
South Dakota lawyers
People from Fox Lake, Wisconsin
Politicians from Sioux Falls, South Dakota
People from Genesee County, New York
Lawrence University alumni
District attorneys in South Dakota
1851 births
1924 deaths
Republican Party United States senators from South Dakota
Republican Party members of the United States House of Representatives from South Dakota
People from Akron, New York
19th-century American lawyers
Members of the United States House of Representatives from South Dakota